The Boise Pilots were a minor league baseball team in the western United States, based in Boise, Idaho. They played in the Pioneer League for a total of 11 seasons between 1939 and 1954. They were unaffiliated with any major league team, and played at the Class C level. Their home venue was originally named Airway Park in 1939, and in 1952 was renamed Joe Devine Airway Park.

History
Minor league baseball began in Boise in 1904 when the Boise Fruit Pickers played as members of the Pacific National League. In 1905, the Boise Infants continued play in the Pacific National League. Boise fielded two teams in 1909, as Boise played as members of the Montana State League, and the Boise Irrigators were members of the Inter-Mountain League. The Boise Irrigators later played in the Union Association (1911, 1914) and Western Tri-State League (1912–1913).

The Boise Pilots immediately followed the Boise Senators of the 1928 Utah-Idaho League and were one of the six original teams of the Pioneer League when it was formed in 1939. The team competed through the 1951 season, except for three years during World War II when the league did not operate.  Boise's team then became the Yankees, who were affiliated with New York during 1952 and 1953. That affiliation did not continue, and the team operated independently again as the Pilots in 1954. Boise's team then became a Milwaukee affiliate from 1955 through 1963, operating as the Braves. After the Braves' final season of 1963, the ballpark was demolished, and Boise was without a minor league team until the Boise A's of the Northwest League debuted in 1975.

Season records

All-stars

Notable players
 Lee Maye
 Ford "Moon" Mullen
 Marv Rickert
 Floyd Robinson
 Gerry Staley

See also
Boise Pilots players

References

External links
Baseball Reference – Boise teams
NWSABR – 1941 team photo

Baseball teams established in 1939
Defunct Pioneer League (baseball) teams
Professional baseball teams in Idaho
Sports in Boise, Idaho
1939 establishments in Idaho
1954 disestablishments in Idaho
Baseball teams disestablished in 1954
Defunct baseball teams in Idaho